McGrane is an Irish surname derived from the Mag Raighne Gaelic Sept that was mainly located in the Province of Leinster and in the Counties of Dublin and Louth in particular. It is also found in Ulster where the variant MacGrann is more prevalent.

List of notable people with the surname McGrane

Bernard McGrane, American sociologist
Damien McGrane, Irish golfer
Dave McGrane, Canadian professor
Dennis McGrane, American Olympic Ski-jumper (1984 and 1988 Olympics)
Dermot McGrane, English football coach
Gail McGrane, Scottish reporter
Ian McGrane, American soccer player
John McGrane, Canadian soccer player
Karen McGrane, American content strategist
Michelle McGrane, Zimbabwean poet
Paul McGrane, Irish Gaelic footballer
Phil McGrane, American politician
Seamus McGrane, Irish dissident republican and leader
Tomás McGrane, Irish hurler
Tony McGrane, Australian politician

See also
Magrane (surname)
McGrann

Irish families
Surnames
Surnames of Irish origin